David Henderson may refer to:

Academy
David Henderson (philosopher) (born 1954), American philosopher 
 David Henderson (psychiatrist) (1884–1965), Scottish psychiatrist
 David W. Henderson (1939–2018), American professor of mathematics
 David Willis Wilson Henderson (1903–1968), Scottish microbiologist. Director of MRE, Porton Down

Economics 
 David Henderson (economist) (1927–2018), chief economist at the OECD in Paris from 1984 to 1992
 David R. Henderson (born 1950), American economist

Journalism 
 David Henderson (broadcaster) (born 1970), Scottish journalist/newsreader working for BBC Scotland
 David Henderson (American journalist), CBS Network News television and radio journalist

Politics 
 David B. Henderson (1840–1906), U.S. politician of the 1890s and 1900s
 David Henderson (Canadian politician) (1841–1922), former Canadian Member of Parliament
 David N. Henderson (1921–2004), U.S. Representative from North Carolina

Sport 
 David Henderson (footballer) (1868–1933), Scottish football player (Liverpool FC)
 Dave Henderson (1958–2015), former Major League Baseball player
 Dave Henderson (footballer) (born 1960), retired Irish football goalkeeper
 David Henderson (basketball) (born 1964), former Duke Co-Captain and head basketball coach at University of Delaware
 David C. Henderson (born c. 1917), American football player and coach of football and basketball
 Dave Henderson (ice hockey) (born 1952), Canadian-born French ice hockey coach and player

Others 
 David Henderson (British Army officer) (1862–1921), senior British Army and, later, RAF officer
 David Ezekiel Henderson (1879–1968), U.S. federal judge
 David Henderson (poet) (born 1942), poet associated with the Umbra workshop and Black Arts Movement
 Davy Henderson (born c. 1962), Scottish musician, The Fire Engines, Win, The Nectarine No. 9
 David Henderson (Christchurch, New Zealand), property developer in New Zealand